The General or The Generals may refer to:

Film and television
 The General (1926 film), a Buster Keaton film
 The General (1992 film), a Russian war film
 The General (1998 film), a John Boorman drama about Dublin criminal Martin Cahill
 The General (TV series), a British TV fly-on-the-wall documentary series about a hospital 
 "The General" (The Prisoner), an episode of The Prisoner
 "The General", an episode of Spyforce
 "The General", an episode of Star Wars: The Clone Wars

Literature

Fictional works 
 "The General", a 1918 poem by Siegfried Sassoon
 The General (C. S. Forester novel), a work about a World War I general
 The General (Muchamore novel), a novel in the CHERUB book series by Robert Muchamore
 The General (series), a series of science fiction novels by S. M. Stirling
 The General (Sillitoe novel), a World War II novel by Alan Sillitoe
 The Generals (novel), a 2007 novel by Simon Scarrow
 The Generals, a novel in the series Brotherhood of War by W. E. B. Griffin

Fictional characters 
 General (DC Comics), an enemy of Batman and other DC superheroes
 General Wade Eiling, another DC Comics supervillain, sometimes known as simply "The General"
 The General, an enemy found in Marvel's Sentry

Non-fiction works
 The General (book), a biography of Charles de Gaulle by Johnathan Fenby
 The General (Bilby book), a biography of David Sarnoff by Kenneth W. Bilby

Music
 "The General" (The Rifles song)
 "The General" (song), a song by Dispatch

Other uses
 The General (horse), a horse owned by American President John Tyler
 The General (locomotive), a locomotive commandeered in the Great Locomotive Chase of the American Civil War
 The General (insurance), an insurance agency specializing in automobile insurance, formerly Permanent General
 The General (magazine), a wargaming magazine published by Avalon Hill
 The General, a nickname for US automobile manufacturer General Motors

People with the nickname
 Martin Cahill (1949-1994), Dublin criminal
 Charles de Gaulle (1890–1970), French statesman and general
 Horace Grant (born 1965), American retired National Basketball Association player
 Les Keiter, American newscaster and sports director
 Bob Knight (born 1940), American retired college basketball coach and current TV analyst
 Mark Lee (Australian rules footballer) (born 1959), Richmond ruckman of the 1980s
 Rinus Michels (1928-2005), Dutch football player and manager

See also
 El General, Panamanian reggaeton artist born Edgardo Franco in 1964
 General (disambiguation)

Lists of people by nickname